Andreas Matzbacher (7 January 1982 – 24 December 2007) was an Austrian professional road bicycle racer. On 24 December 2007 Matzbacher was killed in a car crash in southern Austria after he lost control of his car and crashed into an overhead signpost.

References

External links 
Official Website

Road incident deaths in Austria
Austrian male cyclists
Sportspeople from Graz
1982 births
2007 deaths